Hiroki Iikura (born June 1, 1986 in Aomori, Japan) is a Japanese professional footballer who plays as a goalkeeper  club for Yokohama F. Marinos.

Club statistics
.

Honours
Vissel Kobe
Emperor's Cup: 2019
Japanese Super Cup: 2020

References

External links
Profile at Yokohama F-Marinos

1986 births
Living people
Association football people from Aomori Prefecture
Japanese footballers
J1 League players
Japan Football League players
Yokohama F. Marinos players
Roasso Kumamoto players
Vissel Kobe players
Association football goalkeepers